Adenylyl cyclase-associated protein 2 is an enzyme that in humans is encoded by the CAP2 gene.

Function 

This gene was identified by its similarity to the gene for human adenylyl cyclase-associated protein. The function of the protein encoded by this gene is unknown. However, the protein appears to be able to interact with adenylyl cyclase-associated protein and actin.

Interactions 

CAP2 has been shown to interact with CAP1.

References

External links

Further reading